OP2, Op-2 or Op. 2 may refer to :
 Op. 2, a designation that stands for Opus number 2 in music,
 OP-2, the second model of the Pitcairn OP, the first rotary-wing aircraft
 DARwIn-OP#ROBOTIS_OP2, a robot project
 OP2, a candidate phylum of bacteria